Derek George Damant was the sixth bishop of George.

He was educated at University of South Africa and ordained in  1958. He began his career as chaplain at St. Andrew's School, Bloemfontein after which he was founding head master at St. Stephen's Diocesan High School in  Mohale's Hoek. He then moved to Pretoria where he became Chaplain of St Alban's College. From 1975 he was dean of Pretoria. He ascended to the episcopate in 1985 and retired in 1999.

Damant died in July 2021.

Notes 

2021 deaths
20th-century Anglican Church of Southern Africa bishops
Anglican bishops of George
Deans of Pretoria
University of South Africa alumni
Year of birth missing